The Unity Party, abbreviated to ÖP, was a centre-right political party in Hungary. It had a third way ideology. The party was dissolved on 31 July 2018.

Election results

For the Hungarian Parliament:

References

External links
 Official web site

2009 establishments in Hungary
2018 disestablishments in Hungary
Centrist parties in Hungary
Neoliberal parties
Political parties in Hungary
Political parties established in 2009
Political parties disestablished in 2018
Defunct political parties in Hungary